Group B of the 2017 Africa Cup of Nations was played from 15 to 23 January 2017 in Gabon. The group consisted of Algeria, Tunisia, Senegal, and Zimbabwe.

Senegal and Tunisia advanced to the round of 16 as the top two teams.

Teams

Notes

Standings

In the quarter-finals:
The group winners, Senegal, advanced to play the runners-up of Group A, Cameroon.
The group runners-up, Tunisia, advanced to play the winners of Group A, Burkina Faso.

Matches
All times are local, WAT (UTC+1).

Algeria vs Zimbabwe

Tunisia vs Senegal

Algeria vs Tunisia

Senegal vs Zimbabwe

Senegal vs Algeria

Zimbabwe vs Tunisia

References

External links
2017 Africa Cup of Nations, CAFonline.com

Group B
Africa
Africa